The Information Centre for Human Rights and Democracy is a human rights organization based in Hong Kong that provides information human rights abuses in mainland China for news outlets.  It is run single-handedly by Frank Lu Siqing.

A municipal court document obtained by Lu claims his information center was "registered in Hong Kong by foreign hostile element Frank Lu Siqing."

Lu may be able to continue his operations legally as Hong Kong is governed under the one country, two systems policy.

Lu has been imprisoned in mainland China twice, first in 1981 for calling for freedom of speech and again in 1989 for supporting the Tiananmen Square pro-democracy movement.

Quote

External links
Information Centre for Human Rights and Democracy—Chinese and English versions available
Information Centre for Human Rights and Democracy HKFP 

Human rights organisations based in Hong Kong
Information centres
1989 Tiananmen Square protests and massacre